Marina Köhncke (née Loheit,  born March 8, 1968, in Hamburg-Wandsbek) is a German equestrian rider, who competes in Eventing competitions.

Biography 
Köhncke grew up in Radbruch in Northern Germany. At the age of nine she got her first pony. At the age of eleven she rode on her first horse show, three years later she starts in her first Eventing competition.

In 1985, now riding horses, she became Eventing champion of the German region Hanover/Bremen. After this victory she was nominated for her first international championship, the European Championship of Junior eventing riders. At the 1989 European eventing championship for young riders she won together with the German team the team gold medal.

In 1993 Marina Loheit was the second woman (after Simone Richter-Kals, today Simone Böckmann, in 1988) who won the German eventing championship. Also in this year she was part of the German team at European Eventing Championships in Achselschwang. After two years live in Warendorf she moved to her husband in Badendorf. Now, after her marriage, she is called Marina Köhncke.

In the year 2000, after a second place in the German championship, she was nominated for the Olympic games in Sydney. Together with the team she finish on place four. From 2002 to 2007 she competes on eventing competitions up to CIC**- / CCI**-level. Since 2008 she competes with her horse Calma Schelly again on higher level. In 2010, she rode the Burghley Horse Trials, in April 2011 she started at the Badminton Horse Trials.

Marina Köhncke is a master horse farm manager ("Pferdewirtschaftsmeisterin"). As her trainer she called Martin Plewa and Horst Karsten.

Successful horses 
 current:
 Calma Schelly (born 1999), dark brown Holsteiner mare, sire: Chambertin
 formerly:
 Sir Toby (born 1989), gelding, sire: It's without doubt
 TSF Böttcher's Longchamps (born 1987), brown Trakehner gelding, sire: Sir Shostakovich xx
 Sundance Kid FRH (born 1981), brown Hanoverian gelding, sire: Smaragd
 Arapaima (born 1980), mare

Main results 
 Summer Olympic Games:
 2000, Sydney:
 with Sir Toby fourth in team ranking
 with Longchamps not finished the individual competition (in 2000 team and individual ranking was two different competitions)
 World Equestrian Games:
 1990, Stockholm: with Sundance Kid third in team ranking and seventh in individual ranking
 1998, Rome: with Longchamps not finished the competition, also no team ranking for Germany
 European Eventing Championship:
 1985 (Juniors): with El Extranjero 13th in individual ranking
 1989 (Young riders): with Sundance Kid first in team ranking
 1993, Achselschwang: with Arapaima fourth in team ranking, 10th in individual ranking
 German Eventing Championship:
 Individual:
  1992: with Sundance Kid third place
  1993: with Sundance Kid German champion
  1994: with Arapaima fourth place
  1995: with Sundance Kid fifth place
  1998: with Sir Toby second place
  2000: with Longchamps second place
 Team championship:
 2009: with Calma Schelly German team champion with the team of Schleswig-Holstein

External links 
 web page of Marina Köhncke (not updated)
 Marina Köhncke in Sports reference Olympic database

References 

German female equestrians
German event riders
Olympic equestrians of Germany
Equestrians at the 2000 Summer Olympics
1968 births
Living people
Sportspeople from Hamburg